{{Infobox audio drama
|title=The Wishing Beast & The Vanity Box
|publisher=Big Finish Productions
|series=Doctor Who
|number=97
|featuring=Sixth Doctor  Mel Bush
|cover= Wishing Beast.jpg
|writer=Paul Magrs
|director=
|producer=
|executive_producer=Nicholas BriggsJason Haigh-Ellery
|production_code=7C/V
|set_between=Thicker than Water and Spaceport Fear|length=
|date=July 2007
|}}The Wishing Beast and "The Vanity Box" are Big Finish Productions audio dramas based on the long-running British science fiction television series Doctor Who. Keeping the standard four-episode count of a Big Finish main range release, this release includes The Wishing Beast as a three-episode story and single-episode story "The Vanity Box", together.

The Wishing Beast
The Doctor and Mel investigate the mysterious Wishing Beast on an isolated asteroid.

Cast
The Doctor – Colin Baker
Mel – Bonnie Langford
Maria – Jean Marsh
Eliza – Geraldine Newman
Mildew – Sean Connolly
Daniel – Toby Sawyer
Wishing Beast – Toby Longworth
Female Ghost – Rachel Lawrence

"The Vanity Box"
The Doctor investigates mysterious goings on at a beauty salon.

Cast
The Doctor — Colin Baker
Mel — Bonnie Langford
Nesta — Diana Flacks
Winnie — Christine Moore
Bessy — Rachel Laurence
Monsieur Coiffure — Toby Longworth

Continuity
"The Vanity Box" continues the "Virus Strand" story arc, which started in the previous one-episode stories "Urgent Calls" and "Urban Myths" and culminates in "Mission of the Viyrans".
Jean Marsh has previously appeared in Doctor Who in The Crusade, The Daleks' Master Plan (as Sara Kingdom) and Battlefield'', and has reprised the role of Sara Kingdom for the Companion Chronicles range.

External links
Big Finish Productions – The Wishing Beast

2007 audio plays
Sixth Doctor audio plays
Plays by Paul Magrs